HMCS Resolute (hull number MCB 154) was a  that was constructed for the Royal Canadian Navy during the Cold War. Entering service in 1954, the ship served on the East Coast of Canada until 1964 when Resolute was decommissioned. The vessel was discarded in 1965.

Design and description
The Bay class were designed and ordered as replacements for the Second World War-era minesweepers that the Royal Canadian Navy operated at the time.

They had a complement of 38 officers and ratings.

The Bay-class minesweepers were powered by two GM 12-cylinder diesel engines driving two shafts creating . The ships were armed with one 40 mm Bofors gun and were equipped with minesweeping gear.

Operational history
The ship's keel was laid down on 29 August 1951 by Kingston Shipbuilding at their yard in  Kingston, Ontario. Named for a bay located in Nunavut, Resolute was launched on 20 June 1953. The ship was commissioned on 16 September 1954.

Upon commissioning, Resolute joined the First Canadian Minesweeping Squadron. In May 1956, the First Canadian Minesweeping Squadron deployed as part of the NATO minesweeping exercise Minex Sweep Clear One in the western Atlantic. The ship paid off on 14 February 1964. In 1965, Resolute was declared surplus.

References

Notes

Citations

References
 
 
 
 
 

 

Bay-class minesweepers
Ships built in Ontario
1953 ships
Cold War minesweepers of Canada
Minesweepers of the Royal Canadian Navy